Jeff St John (born Jeffrey Leo Newton; 22 April 1946 – 6 March 2018), was an Australian musician best known for several Australian hits, such as "Teach Me How to Fly" (1970), "Big Time Operator" (1967) and "A Fool in Love" (1977).

Early life
St John was born Jeffrey Leo Newton on 22 April 1946, in Newtown, Sydney, Australia, and attended Cleveland Street Boys High School in Surry Hills, New South Wales. He was born with spina bifida and spent much of his life in a wheelchair.

Music career
St John appeared with a number of bands during the late 1960s and early 1970s including; John The Syndicate aka The Wild Oats (1965), The Id (1966–67) with Bob Bertles (tenor sax 1967), Jeff St John & Yama (1967–68), Jeff St John & Copperwine (1969–72), with Harry Brus (bass 1970–72) and Wendy Saddington (co-lead vocals 1970–71), Jeff St John Band (1972–73) and Red Cloud (1975–76)

In 1980, St John was the subject of an episode of the documentary series The Australians, presented by Peter Luck. The episode was titled "Jeff St. John – Rock 'n' Roll Man".

In 1988, as part of Australian Bicentenary celebrations along with many other Australian celebrities, St John took part in a video shoot at Uluru (once called Ayers Rock), called Celebration of a Nation.

St John was involved in educating people about disabilities and was a member of spina bifida support group MOSAIC. He appeared at the opening of the 2000 Summer Paralympics in Sydney where he sang the Australian National Anthem., and a song written for the opening ceremony called The Challenge.

St John's autobiography, The Jeff St John Story: The Inside Outsider, edited by James Anfuso, was published by Starman Books in 2015.

Discography

Albums

Charting singles

Death
Jeff St John died in the morning of 6 March 2018, at Fiona Stanley Hospital in Perth, Western Australia. His death was caused by a bacterial infection following surgery.

References

1946 births
2018 deaths
Australian male singers
Singers from Sydney
People with spina bifida